Atchabahian  also shorted to 'Atcha', 'Bahian' or 'Atchaba', is an Armenian surname, of mixed Armenian and Iranian origin. It derives from a mixture of an old Armenian word atch, eye, and "bah" to keep, translating into watchman, or one who keeps an eye out, '. The "IAN" ending is common among Armenian, Assyrian and Iranian surnames.

Atchaba is a variant for Turkish-Armenians, Lebanese Armenians and Syrian Armenians.
The shortened version 'Atcha' shouldn't be confused with the Indian family name, Atcha/Atchia.

Surnames
Armenian-language surnames